Lamium coutinhoi is a species of flowering plant in the mint family Lamiaceae, endemic to central and northern Portugal. It inhabits path margins, roadsides and damp slopes, pastures and edges of cultivated fields, in granitic substrates.

References

coutinhoi
Endemic flora of Portugal
Endemic flora of the Iberian Peninsula
Plants described in 1947